Huron is a city in Beadle County, South Dakota, United States. It is the county seat of Beadle County. The Huron Daily Plainsman, also referred to as the Plainsman, is the newspaper. The first settlement at Huron was made in 1880. The city was named after the Huron Indians. It is currently the eighth largest city in South Dakota, but it once was the fourth. In recent years, Huron's population has once again started to grow after nearly 20 years of stagnation. A welcoming immigration policy coupled with an economic revival in the area has sparked development. A Walmart Supercenter opened in the mid 2000s. Since Walmart's opening more commercial and residential development has occurred with the completion of a new Runnings store (retailer specializing in farm and fleet products), and many new apartments, twin homes and houses.

The greater Huron area is home to approximately 30,000 people. The population within the city limits was 14,263 at the 2020 census. Huron was once in the running for capital of South Dakota but lost out to Pierre due to Pierre's positioning. Huron is home to the South Dakota State Fair, which is held six days before Labor Day.  It is also home to a statue known as "The World's Largest Pheasant", which was refurbished in the summer of 2011.
Huron has rail service, provided by the Rapid City, Pierre and Eastern Railroad.

Geography and climate

Huron has been assigned the ZIP codes 57350 and 57399 and the FIPS place code 31060.

Huron has a humid continental climate, with hot, humid summers, cold, dry winters, and wide temperature extremes; it is part of USDA hardiness zone 4b. The average window for freezing temperatures are September 30 through May 5, allowing a growing season of 147 days.

Demographics

2010 census
As of the census of 2010, there were 12,592 people, 5,418 households, and 3,179 families residing in the city. The racial makeup of the city was 86.9% White, 1.0% African American, 1.2% Native American, 4.9% Asian, 0.1% Pacific Islander, 3.9% from other races, and 1.9% from two or more races. Hispanic or Latino of any race were 9.8% of the population.

There were 5,418 households, of which 28.7% had children under the age of 18 living with them, 44.4% were married couples living together, 9.8% had a female householder with no husband present, 4.4% had a male householder with no wife present, and 41.3% were non-families. 36.1% of all households were made up of individuals, and 15% had someone living alone who was 65 years of age or older. The average household size was 2.27 and the average family size was 2.94.

The median age in the city was 39.8 years. 24.1% of residents were under the age of 18; 8.7% were between the ages of 18 and 24; 22.8% were from 25 to 44; 26.4% were from 45 to 64; and 17.8% were 65 years of age or older. The gender makeup of the city was 49.4% male and 50.6% female.

2000 census
As of the census of 2000, there were 11,893 people, 5,263 households, and 3,047 families residing in the city. The population density was 1,448.5 people per square mile (559.3/km2). There were 5,872 housing units at an average density of 715.2 per square mile (276.2/km2). The racial makeup of the city was 95.92% White, 0.96% African American, 1.29% Native American, 0.42% Asian, 0.03% Pacific Islander, 0.35% from other races, and 1.03% from two or more races. Hispanic or Latino of any race were 1.20% of the population.

There were 5,263 households, out of which 26.4% had children under the age of 18 living with them, 46.6% were married couples living together, 8.5% had a female householder with no husband present, and 42.1% were non-families. 37.3% of all households were made up of individuals, and 16.8% had someone living alone who was 65 years of age or older. The average household size was 2.18 and the average family size was 2.86.

As of 2000 the median income for a household in the city was $29,097. Males had a median income of $27,027 versus $19,921 for females. The per capita income for the city was $18,275.

Government
The Huron government is "commissioner form". Under the commissioner form of government the board of commissioners consists of a mayor and four commissioners, who are all elected at large for three-year terms. The commission has control over all departments of the city and can make and enforce rules and regulations which it may see fit for the organization, management, and operation of the departments of the city. Responsibilities are divided into the following areas: Public Safety Commissioner, Public Works Commissioner, Utilities Commissioner, and Finance Commissioner with each commissioner having oversight in each respective area.

Huron has a federal building, field offices that is home to Social Security Administration, Western Area Power Administration, United States Fish and Wildlife Service, General Services Administration, Farm Service Agency and the USDA. Huron is also home to Area offices for state offices.

History

Huron, located in east central South Dakota, is a result of railroad and land booms in the 1880s. The early history of the town is closely linked with the Chicago and Northwestern Railway. At the direction of Marvin Hughitt, general manager of the railroad, the west bank of the James River was selected as the division headquarters of the railroad. Huron was named for the Huron Indians. Exactly who gave it the name was never established, apparently either Marvin Hughitt or someone in the Chicago office of the C&NW railroad company.

The original plat covered 11 blocks from 1st Street to 3rd Street and from Iowa Avenue SE to Ohio Avenue SW. Huron's first settler was John Cain, a practical printer from Troy, New York.  He learned in Chicago, from the railroad people, that they would have their chief town and operating headquarters at their James River crossing.

From 1880 until the capital was permanently located at Pierre in 1904, Huron was in the thick of the fight for the honor of being the capital city. Campbell and Winter Parks are the only remaining properties that were once designated capital grounds. Located between the two parks, Victorian houses originally built around 1906 occupy the city block on the land originally slated for the capitol building.

Huron is the home to a handful of celebrities. Cheryl Ladd replaced Farrah Fawcett of the original Charlie's Angels. Gladys Pyle was the first female member of the South Dakota House of Representatives and the first Republican woman in the US Senate. Hubert H. Humphrey was the Democratic nominee for president in 1968 and served as vice president under Lyndon B. Johnson.
Chronology:
1879 – The town site was located
1880 – Town site surveyed and platted
1881 – First town government formed - a board of four trustees, a town clerk, a justice of the peace, one marshal and a surveyor
1882 – Alderman system of government adopted
1883 – Incorporated as the City of Huron - the city still operates under the original charter and seal
1910 – Changed from alderman to city commission form of government
1935 – City manager form of government adopted

Notable people

 Adolphus W. Burtt, South Dakota Attorney General
 Earl Caddock, professional wrestler.
 J. L. Carr, English novelist, taught at the public school in Huron in 1938–1939 and 1956–1957.
 Roxanne Conlin, Iowan politician, ran for senator in 2010.
 Patrick Davis, Republican political consultant and former director of the National Republican Senatorial Committee.
 John K. Fairbank, historian of China, was born in Huron in 1907.
 Archibald K. Gardner, former federal judge
 Bob Glanzer (1945-2020), member South Dakota House of Representatives 2017
 Jennifer Jean Hart, one of the perpetrators of the Hart family murders
 Candace Hilligoss, actress.
 Muriel Humphrey, U.S. Senator from Minnesota in 1978 and wife of Hubert Humphrey.
 Raymond A. Johnson, aviation pioneer.
 Craig Kennedy, member of the South Dakota Senate
 Cheryl Ladd, actress and singer.
 Vernon C. Miller, Beadle County Sheriff turned Prohibition criminal.
 Arthur L. Padrutt, Wisconsin politician.
 John M. Patton, member of the Minnesota Senate and funeral director.
 Gladys Pyle, first woman elected to the U.S. Senate without having previously been appointed.
 John L. Pyle, Attorney General of South Dakota, 1899–1902.
 Mamie Shields Pyle, women's suffrage advocate.
 Mike Rounds, South Dakota governor and U.S. senator.
 Chic Sale, actor and vaudevillian, born in Huron.
 Ron Tschetter, Director of the Peace Corps.
 Fred M. Wilcox, South Dakota state senator
 Josh Haeder, 33rd State Treasurer of South Dakota.

Education
The Huron School District has three public elementary schools, one middle school, and one high school. Huron High School's mascot is the "Tigers".

The principal of the Huron High School is Michael Radke, as of 2020–21 school year.

The current assistant principal of 2020–21 school year is Rodney Mittelstedt.

It was the home of Si Tanka University (formerly Huron College) from 1983 to 2005.

Huron is also home to a Catholic elementary school called Holy Trinity School, and a private Christian school on the north side of town called James Valley Christian School.

Entertainment
After the Si Tanka University closed, the city bought the Fine Arts Center and operates it as a theater for the community.

In 2005, The Huron Event Center was opened connecting the Arena and the Crossroads, a local hotel; the event center is owned by the city.

The State Fair is at the South Dakota State Fair Speedway.

In 2012, the city government built a new water park (Splash Central) on the property that Huron University (Si Tanka) once occupied.

Splash Central has an Olympic-sized pool, two large slides, a lazy river, and a large kids section.

Media

Television

AM radio

FM radio

Transportation
U.S. Route 14 is an east–west route passing through the northern part of the city. It intersects with north–south South Dakota Highway 37 in the city. This was the historical designation of the north–south U.S. Route 281, which was later moved to a more direct route that passes about ten miles west of Huron.

The Rapid City, Pierre and Eastern Railroad runs east–west, with maintenance facilities and a working roundhouse in the city.

The Huron Regional Airport is city-owned. It had scheduled passenger flights operated by a commuter air carrier, Great Lakes Airlines, with Beechcraft 1900D commuter turboprop aircraft service to Denver. The airport does not currently see scheduled service.

See also
 USS Huron, at least 2 ships

Bibliography
 J.L. Carr (1957) The Old Timers. A social history of the way of life of the home-steading pioneers in the prairie states during the first few years of settlement, as shown by a typical community, the 'old-timers' of Beadle County in South Dakota. Huron, South Dakota: privately printed.

 Mildred McEwen Jones (1961) Early Beadle County 1879 to 1900. Huron, South Dakota: privately printed.

Notes

References

External links

 Huron government website

 
Cities in Beadle County, South Dakota
Cities in South Dakota
County seats in South Dakota
Micropolitan areas of South Dakota
Populated places established in 1883
1883 establishments in Dakota Territory